Arch Oboler's Comedy Theater was an early American comedy television program. It aired on ABC for six episodes from September 23 to November 4, 1949. It was an anthology series of sorts, with each episode featuring a different set of characters. At least one episode consisted of three unrelated comedy segments. At least some of the episodes exist as kinescope recordings, representing early examples of television comedy.

See also
Arch Oboler's Plays - Radio series

References

External links

1949 American television series debuts
1949 American television series endings
1940s American anthology television series
Black-and-white American television shows
English-language television shows
American Broadcasting Company original programming
American live television series